Today and Tomorrow is a 1912 film directed by Michael Curtiz and starring Gyula Abonyi and Jenőné Veszprémy.

Plot summary

Cast
 Artúr Somlay - Mel grof
Gyula Abonyi - Az öreg gróf
 Jenőné Veszprémy - Az öreg gróf felesége (as Veszprémyné)
 Endre Szeghő - Kázmér herceg
 Gyula Fehér - A bankár
 Ilonka Ordó - Pierette
 Gyula Szalay - Pierett
 Michael Curtiz - Arisztid
 Antal Hajdu - Dezső gróf
 Böske Kelemen - Szobaleány
 K. Kovács Andor - Inas (as K.Kovács Andor)
 László Gabányi - Tiszttartó (as Gabányi)
 Artúr Somlay - Mel gróf
 Ilona Cs. Aczél - A hercegnő (as Aczél Ilona)

References

External links
 
 

1912 films
Films directed by Michael Curtiz
Hungarian silent films
Hungarian black-and-white films
Austro-Hungarian films